Equity, formerly officially titled the British Actors' Equity Association, is the trade union for the performing arts and entertainment industries.

Formed by a group of West End performers in 1930, the union grew to include performers and stage management nationwide, as well as gaining recognition in audio, film, and television. Equity incorporated the Variety Artistes' Federation in 1967, and now represents most professionals whose work is presented on stage or screen.

As of 2021, it had just over 46,000 members, including actors, singers, dancers, variety artistes and other performers, models, theatre directors, choreographers, designers, and stage management.

Equity requires its members to have unique professional names to avoid confusion with other artists and entertainers.

History
Equity was created in 1930 by a group of West End performers, including Godfrey Tearle, May Whitty and Ben Webster. They were advised by Robert Young, the "Actors' MP". Like many other British trade unions, Equity operated a closed-shop policy, so it was not possible for someone to join unless they had a record of sufficient paid work and most jobs were reserved for Equity card holders. To allow new members to join, there was a limited number of non-card-holding jobs on regional productions. While working on these productions, actors held a provisional membership card, and could apply for full membership on completing the requisite number of weeks, subsequently allowing them to work in the West End or on film and television.

As a result of reforms of trade unions by Margaret Thatcher's Conservative government and the introduction of European legislation, closed-shop unions became illegal in the UK and Equity discontinued their closed-shop policy in the 1980s. However, to join Equity in the present day, evidence of sufficient paid professional work must still be provided. In 1976, Equity introduced a policy of refusing to sell programmes to the SABC, an action that led to a virtual ban of British television in apartheid-era South Africa, which was not lifted until 1993.

The Clarence Derwent Awards are theatre awards given annually by Equity on Broadway in the U.S. and Equity UK in London's West End.

Presidents

 1932: Godfrey Seymour Tearle
 1940: Lewis Thomas Casson
 1946: Beatrix Lehmann
 1948: Leslie Banks
 1949: Felix Aylmer
 1969: Ernest Clark
 1973: André Morell
 1975: Hugh Manning
 1978: John Barron
 1982: Hugh Manning
 1984: Derek Bond
 1986: Nigel Davenport
 1992: Jeffry Wickham
 1994: Frederick Pyne
 2002: Harry Landis
 2008: Graham Hamilton
 2010: Malcolm Sinclair
 2018: Maureen Beattie
 2022: Lynda Rooke

General Secretaries
1930: Alfred M. Wall
1939: C. B. Purdom
1940: Llewellyn Rees
1946: Gordon Sandison
1958: Gerald Croasdell
1973: Peter Plouviez
1991: Ian McGarry
2005: Christine Payne
2020: Paul W. Fleming

See also

Actors' Equity Association
Federation of Entertainment Unions
International Federation of Actors
Irish Congress of Trade Unions
SAG-AFTRA
Scottish Trades Union Congress
Trades Union Congress

References

Further reading

External links
 

1929 establishments in the United Kingdom
Actors' trade unions
Entertainment industry unions
Film organisations in the United Kingdom
International opposition to apartheid in South Africa
Television organisations in the United Kingdom
Theatrical organisations in the United Kingdom
Trade unions affiliated with the Trades Union Congress
Trade unions based in London
Trade unions established in 1930
Trade unions in the United Kingdom